Raúl Parra Artal (born 26 November 1999) is a Spanish professional footballer who plays as a right back for Cádiz CF.

Club career
Parra was born in Zaragoza, Aragon, and finished his formation with EM El Olivar. On 28 June 2018, he moved to Tercera División side CD La Almunia.

Parra made his senior debut on 26 August 2018, starting and scoring the equalizer in a 1–1 home draw against CD Belchite 97. After being a regular starter and scoring six goals for the side, he moved to RCD Mallorca on 31 January of the following year, being initially assigned to the reserves also in the fourth division.

On 31 August 2020, Parra signed a one-year contract with Segunda División B side CD Guijuelo. On 23 June of the following year, he agreed to a deal with Cádiz CF and was assigned to the B-side in the Segunda División RFEF.

Parra made his first-team debut on 16 December 2021, starting in a 1–0 away win against Albacete Balompié in the season's Copa del Rey. His professional debut occurred the following 6 January, as he played the full 90 minutes in an away success over CF Fuenlabrada for the same scoreline, also in the national cup.

Parra made his La Liga debut on 18 January 2022, playing the last 12 minutes in a 2–2 home draw against RCD Espanyol. On 4 August, he was loaned to Segunda División side CD Mirandés for the season.

On 26 December 2022, Parra's loan was cut short, and he was definitely assigned to Cádiz's main squad.

Personal life
Parra's older brother Álvaro is also a footballer. A central defender, he notably represented Deportivo Aragón and AE Prat.

References

External links

1999 births
Living people
Footballers from Zaragoza
Spanish footballers
Association football defenders
La Liga players
Segunda División players
Segunda División B players
Segunda Federación players
Tercera División players
RCD Mallorca B players
CD Guijuelo footballers
Cádiz CF B players
Cádiz CF players
CD Mirandés footballers